Régénérateur was a  74-gun ship of the line of the French Navy.

Career 
Régénérateur was one of the ships built in the various shipyards captured by the First French Empire in Holland and Italy in a crash programme to replenish the ranks of the French Navy. Started as Severo, she was built in Venice under supervision of engineers Moro and Andrea Salvini following plans by Sané; in 1807, she was renamed Régénérateur (or possibly Regeneratore or Regenitore).

Régénérateur was surrendered to Austria at the fall of Venice, and commissioned in the Austrian Navy. In 1823, she was razéed into a frigate and renamed Bellona. She was eventually broken up in 1831.

Notes, citations, and references

Notes

Citations

References
 

Ships of the line of the French Navy
Téméraire-class ships of the line
1811 ships